Ole Brask (April 4, 1935 – March 23, 2009) was a Danish photographer who specialized in jazz photography. There are two published collections of his work; Jazz People published in 1976 by H. N. Abrams, New York City and Ole Brask Photographs Jazz published in 1995 by Nieswand Verlag Germany.

References

External links
 Masters of Jazz Photography

1935 births
2009 deaths
20th-century Danish photographers
Danish photographers
Jazz photographers